Mahy may refer to:

Margaret Mahy (1936–2012), New Zealand children's author
Nathalie Mahy child murdered along with her step sister by Abdallah Ait-Oud
Barry Mahy, soccer player
Thomas de Mahy, marquis de Favras, French aristocrat
Thomas Henry Mahy, newspaper columnist